Francesco "Franco" D'Andrea (born 8 March 1941 in Merano, Italy) is an Italian jazz pianist and composer.

Life 
D'Andrea is considered one of the most famous jazz musicians from Italy and has recorded some 200 albums. He developed his style in the 1960s and won several awards in his home country. He has worked with Gato Barbieri, Steve Lacy, Dave Liebman, John Surman, Kenny Wheeler, Phil Woods, Ernst Reijseger, Slide Hampton, Frank Rosolino, Conte Candoli, Max Roach, Lee Konitz, Johnny Griffin, Tony Scott, Han Bennink, Dave Douglas and also with numerous Italian musicians.

His career began in 1963 with Nunzio Rotondo, playing for the Italian broadcast RAI and in Gato Barbieri's band in 1964 until 1965. D'Andrea continued then with the Italian vanguard ensemble Modern Art Trio (1968-72) and Perigeo (1972-77). Since 1978, he has been playing with his own bands (Trio, Quartet, Eleven) and as a solo performer. He has been a teacher at the Conservatorio "F.A. Bonporti" in Trento 1994-2006 and currently at Mitteleuorpean Jazz Academy in Merano and at Siena Jazz.

In 2010, he received for his life's work the Award "Musicien Européen de l'année" (Académie du Jazz de France) and 2011 the Honorary Award at the Italian Jazz Awards - Luca Flores.

Discography

As leader/co-leader

As sideman
With Gato Barbieri
 Last Tango in Paris (United Artists, 1972)
With Lee Konitz
Stereokonitz (RCA, 1968)
With Phil Woods

 Ornithology (Philology, 1994)

With Perigeo 

 1972 Azimut
 1973 Abbiamo tutti un blues da piangere
 1974 Genealogia
 1975 La valle dei templi
 1975 Live at Montreaux (Live)
 1976 Non è poi così lontano
 1976 Live in Italy 1976 (Live)
 1977 Attraverso il Perigeo (Raccolta)
 1977 Fata Morgana (LP, Album) (RCA Victor)

With Perigeo Special 

 1980 Alice

Bibliography 

 26 compositions, Crepuscule, Milano 1982
  Enciclopedia comparata delle scale e degli accordi (with Attilio Zanchi), Centro Professione Musica, Carisch, Milano, 1992
  Dall'Africa allo swing - la poliritmia nel linguaggio Jazz, educational film, Carisch, Milano, 1996
 Aree intervallari (with Luigi Ranghino), Volontè & Co, 2011

Filmography 
 2006 - Franco D'Andrea Jazz Pianist (Miramonte Film)

References

External links 
 web page
 biography & discography www.ejn.it (Europe Jazz Network: Musicians)
 documentary, director: Andreas Pichler

 mitteleuropean jazz academy  Merano/Italy
 miramontefilm

1941 births
Italian jazz pianists
Italian male pianists
Living people
Red Records artists
20th-century Italian musicians
21st-century Italian musicians
People from Merano
21st-century pianists
20th-century Italian male musicians
21st-century Italian male musicians
Male jazz musicians
Perigeo members